The 2015–16 South Pacific cyclone season was one of the most disastrous South Pacific tropical cyclone seasons on record, with a total of 50 deaths and $1.405 billion (2016 USD) in damage. Throughout the season, 8 systems attained tropical cyclone status, whilst 5 became severe tropical cyclones. Winston went on to devastate Fiji, causing $1.4 billion (2016 USD) in damage and 44 deaths across the country.

The 2015–16 season marked the period of the year when most tropical cyclones form within the South Pacific Ocean to the east of 160°E. The season officially ran from November 1, 2015, to April 30, 2016, however a tropical cyclone could form at any time between July 1, 2015, and June 30, 2016, and would count towards the season total. During the season, tropical cyclones are officially monitored by the Fiji Meteorological Service and the Meteorological Service of New Zealand (MetService). Other warning centres like the Australian Bureau of Meteorology and the United States Joint Typhoon Warning Center (JTWC) will also monitor the basin. The FMS and MetService both use the Australian Tropical Cyclone Intensity Scale and estimate wind speeds over a period of ten minutes, while the JTWC estimated sustained winds over a 1-minute period, which are subsequently compared to the Saffir–Simpson hurricane wind scale (SSHWS).



Seasonal forecasts

After the occurrences of Tropical Cyclone Raquel and Tropical Depression 01F during July and August 2015, the Fiji Meteorological Service (FMS) noted that the ongoing 2014–16 El Niño event, might mean that more tropical cyclones occur in the basin than usual during the season. It was also noted that during previous El Niño episodes the season started early, with systems developing before the start of the season on November 1. As a result, the FMS expected the tropical cyclone season to start during October 2015. During September 24, Météo-France announced that there was a 90% chance of either a moderate tropical storm, severe tropical storm or tropical cyclone, impacting the waters surrounding French Polynesia during the season. Ahead of the cyclone season, the FMS, the BoM, Météo-France, New Zealand's MetService and National Institute of Water and Atmospheric Research (NIWA) and various other Pacific Meteorological services, all contributed towards the Island Climate Update tropical cyclone outlook that was released during October 2015.

The outlook took into account the strong El Niño conditions that had been observed across the Pacific and analogue seasons that had ENSO neutral and weak El Niño conditions occurring during the season. The outlook called for an above average number of tropical cyclones for the 2015–16 season, with eleven to thirteen named tropical cyclones to occur between 135°E and 120°W compared to an average of 10–12. At least six of the tropical cyclones were expected to become category 3 severe tropical cyclones, while four could become category 4 severe tropical cyclones. In addition to contributing towards the Island Climate Update outlook the BoM and the FMS, issued their own seasonal forecasts for the South Pacific region. The BoM issued a seasonal forecast for both the Western and Eastern South Pacific. The Western region between 142.5°E and 165°E was predicted to have a 15% chance of having an above average number of tropical cyclones, while the Eastern region between 165°E and 120°W was predicted to have a 48% chance of having an above average number of tropical cyclones. Within their outlook the FMS predicted that between ten and fourteen tropical cyclones, would occur within the basin compared to an average of around 7.3 cyclones. Between four and eight of these tropical cyclones were expected to intensify into category 3 severe tropical cyclones, while 3-7 might intensify into Category 4 or 5 severe tropical cyclones. They also reported that the tropical cyclone genesis trough was expected to be displaced far eastwards of its long term average position. This was based on the expected and predicted ENSO conditions, and the existence of the Pacific warm pool of sub-surface temperature anomalies in this region.

Both the Island Climate Update and the FMS tropical cyclone outlooks assessed the risk of a tropical cyclone affecting a certain island or territory. As the tropical cyclone genesis trough of low pressure was expected to be located near to and to the east of the International Date Line, normal or slightly above normal activity was expected for areas near the dateline. With the exception of Kiribati, Papua New Guinea, New Caledonia, Niue, and Tonga, the Island Climate Update predicted that all areas would experience an elevated risk of being affected by multiple tropical cyclones. The FMS's outlook predicted that the Solomon and Northern Cook Islands, Wallis and Futuna, Tokelau, Samoa, and French Polynesia had a highly elevated chance of being affected by a tropical cyclone. Vanuatu, Fiji, Niue, and the Southern Cook Islands had an elevated risk, while a normal risk was anticipated for New Caledonia, Tuvalu, and Tonga.

Seasonal summary

Systems

Tropical Depression 01F

The system lay to the north of an upper level subtropical ridge of high pressure in an area of moderate vertical wind shear. Over the next couple of days the system slowly organised further as it steered south-eastwards into an area of decreasing vertical wind shear.

Tropical Depression 02F

The system was located within a favourable environment for further development, with low to moderate vertical wind shear, and it lay under an upper-level ridge of high pressure.

Tropical Cyclone Tuni

The system lay in an area of low to moderate vertical wind shear, to the south of an upper-level ridge of high pressure.

Across American Samoa, Tuni produced strong winds and heavy rains. Some trees were uprooted. Plantations, shacks, and garages sustained damage with total losses amounting to US$5 million. There was no significant damage recorded in Niue, as the system brushed the island nation.

Severe Tropical Cyclone Ula

In late December 2015, a long-lived and powerful westerly wind burst triggered the formation of a tropical disturbance in the south Pacific, along with its twin in the central North Pacific, which became Tropical Depression Nine-C.

Tropical Depression 07F

Three people died in seagoing accidents related to Tropical Depression 07F, while four others went missing.

Severe Tropical Cyclone Victor

A few days later, the system was classified as an invest, until JTWC classified it with a low-chance of developing to a tropical cyclone on January 13. Later in that same day, 08F was upgraded to a tropical depression. On January 14, the JTWC issued a TCFA alert as 08F was located in moderate wind shear and warm sea-surface temperatures, which were conductive for tropical development. On January 15, 08F was upgraded to a Category 1 tropical cyclone and was therefore named Victor.

Severe Tropical Cyclone Winston

Tropical Disturbance 09F developed on February 7, 2016, to the northwest of Port Vila, Vanuatu. Over the next few days, the system gradually developed as it moved southeastward, acquiring gale-force winds by February 11. Less favourable environmental conditions prompted weakening thereafter. After turning northeast on February 14, Winston stalled to the north of Tonga on February 17. Regaining strength, the storm doubled back to the west, achieving Category 5 status on both the Australian tropical cyclone scale and the Saffir–Simpson hurricane wind scale on February 19. This made it the strongest storm to ever strike the nation, as well as the strongest tropical cyclone of the Southern Hemisphere in history.

On February 26, Winston exited the South Pacific basin and entered the Australian region basin.

In advance of the storm's arrival in Fiji, numerous shelters were opened, and a nationwide curfew was instituted during the evening of February 20. Striking Fiji at Category 5 intensity on February 20, Winston inflicted extensive damage on many islands and killed at least 44 people. Communications were temporarily lost with at least six islands. Total damage from Winston amounted to $FJ 2.98 billion ($1.4 billion 2016 USD), making it the costliest cyclone on record in the basin.

Tropical Cyclone Tatiana

Tropical Cyclone Tatiana moved into the South Pacific basin from the Australian region during February 12, as it peaked as a Category 2 tropical cyclone with 10-minute sustained winds of 95 km/h (60 mph). The system subsequently moved southwards and rapidly weakened during the next day, crossing back into BoM's area of responsibility. On the next day it degenerated into a remnant low.

Tropical Cyclone Yalo

By the next day, the JTWC issued a Tropical Cyclone Formation Alert as it was located over in favorable conditions of developing further.

Severe Tropical Cyclone Zena

Severe Tropical Cyclone Zena passed near Fiji.

Severe Tropical Cyclone Amos

Other systems

As the 2015–16 tropical cyclone year opened on July 1, Tropical Cyclone Raquel was located in the Australian region to the north-west of Honiara. Over the next 24 hours, the system recurved eastwards and weakened into a tropical depression, as it entered the basin on July 2. The system subsequently moved westwards and out of the basin during July 4, as it impacted the Solomon Islands, with high wind gusts and heavy rain. Over the next day the poorly organised system moved westwards, underneath an upper-level ridge of high pressure before it dissipated during December 2. During December 27, Tropical Disturbance 06F developed to the north of Wallis Island, in an area of moderate to high vertical wind shear.

However, during that day as the system moved southwards in an area of low vertical wind shear, atmospheric convection decreased in magnitude before it was last noted during March 1. Over the next couple of days the system moved east-southeast, before it was last noted during March 21, to the southeast of New Caledonia.

On April 2, Tropical Disturbance 14F formed from an active monsoon trough over Vanuatu. The system moved in a slow eastward motion over in an area of favorable environments, thus, RSMC Nadi forecast the system to reach tropical cyclone intensity. During April 5, 14F began to weaken with a lack of further organisation and therefore, RSMC Nadi issued its final bulletin later that day. In the same time when 14F was formed, RSMC Nadi had reported of the formation of Tropical Disturbance 15F just to the east of Fiji. Again, 15F was located over in favorable environments with deep convection and a developing LLCC. During April 4, the JTWC issued a TCFA on the system, however it was also mentioned that organization started to weaken. 15F passed Fiji and rapidly diminished on April 6. During April 20, Tropical Disturbance 18F developed within an area of low to moderate vertical wind-shear, to the south of an upper-level ridge of high pressure to the north of the Southern Cook Islands.

Season effects
This table lists all the storms that developed in the South Pacific to the east of longitude 160°E during the 2015–16 season. It includes their intensity on the Australian tropical cyclone intensity scale, duration, name, landfalls, deaths, and damages. All data is taken from RSMC Nadi and/or TCWC Wellington, and all of the damage figures are in 2015 USD.

|-
|  ||  || bgcolor=#| || bgcolor=#| || bgcolor=#| || Solomon Islands, Vanuatu || None || None ||
|-
|  ||  || bgcolor=#| || bgcolor=#| || bgcolor=#| || Vanuatu || None || None ||
|-
|  ||  || bgcolor=#| || bgcolor=#| || bgcolor=#| || Tuvalu, Samoan Islands, Niue, Tonga ||   || None ||
|-
|  ||  || bgcolor=#| || bgcolor=#| || bgcolor=#| || French Polynesia || None || None ||
|-
|  ||  || bgcolor=#| || bgcolor=#| || bgcolor=#| || Tuvalu, Samoan Islands, TongaFiji, Vanuatu, New Caledonia || Minimal ||  ||
|-
|  ||  || bgcolor=#| || bgcolor=#| || bgcolor=#| || Wallis and Futuna || None || None ||
|-
|  ||  || bgcolor=#| || bgcolor=#| || bgcolor=#| || Solomon Islands, Tuvalu, Fiji || None ||  ||
|-
|  ||  || bgcolor=#| || bgcolor=#| || bgcolor=#| || Northern Cook Islands, Niue, Tonga || None || None ||
|-
|  ||  || bgcolor=#| || bgcolor=#| || bgcolor=#| || Vanuatu, Fiji, Tonga, Niue ||  || 44 ||
|-
|  ||  || bgcolor=#| || bgcolor=#| || bgcolor=#| || None || None || None ||
|-
|  ||  || bgcolor=#| || bgcolor=#| || bgcolor=#| || Cook Islands, French Polynesia || None || None ||
|-
|  ||  || bgcolor=#| || bgcolor=#| || bgcolor=#| || French Polynesia || None || None ||
|-
|  ||  || bgcolor=#| || bgcolor=#| || bgcolor=#| || New Caledonia, Vanuatu || None || None ||
|-
|  ||  || bgcolor=#| || bgcolor=#| || bgcolor=#| || Vanuatu || None || None ||
|-
|  ||  || bgcolor=#| || bgcolor=#| || bgcolor=#| || Fiji || Minor || None ||
|-
|  ||  || bgcolor=#| || bgcolor=#| || bgcolor=#| || Solomon Islands, VanuatuFiji, Tonga || Minimal || 2 || 
|-
|  ||  || bgcolor=#| || bgcolor=#| || bgcolor=#| || Fiji, Wallis and FutunaSamoan Islands || Minimal || None ||
|-
|  ||  || bgcolor=#| || bgcolor=#| || bgcolor=#| || French Polynesia || None || None ||
|-

See also

Weather of 2015 and 2016
Tropical cyclones in 2015 and 2016
List of South Pacific cyclone seasons
Atlantic hurricane seasons: 2015, 2016
Pacific hurricane seasons: 2015, 2016
Pacific typhoon seasons: 2015, 2016
North Indian Ocean cyclone seasons: 2015, 2016
2015–16 South-West Indian Ocean cyclone season
2015–16 Australian region cyclone season

Notes

References

External links

 
South Pacific cyclone seasons
2015 SPac
2016 Spac